The Tyranny of the Market is a book written by then-Wharton School of Business professor Joel Waldfogel. According to Forbes the book "makes the case that while markets do a good job of providing products that a majority of people demand, they can fall short of meeting the needs of consumers with less prevalent preferences."

See also
 Scroogenomics – also written by Waldfogel

References

External links
 

2007 non-fiction books
Business books
Books critical of capitalism
Harvard University Press books